Jay Jones (born February 25, 1974) is a former American football wide receiver who played six seasons with the Albany/Indiana Firebirds of the Arena Football League. He played college football at James Madison University. He is now the Dean of Students at Logansport Junior High School in Logansport, Indiana since January 2018

College career
Jones played college football for the James Madison Dukes, recording career totals of 151 receptions, 1,862 receiving yards, 14 receiving touchdowns, 819 kickoff return yards, and 2,760 all-purpose yards. He set the NCAA Division I-AA record with 268 kickoff return yards in a win against the Richmond Spiders during the 1996 season after returning a kickoff for a touchdown and another for 92 yards.

Professional career
Jones played for the Albany/Indiana Firebirds from 1998 to 2003, earning Second Team All-Arena honors in 2001.

References

External links
Just Sports Stats

Living people
1974 births
Players of American football from Richmond, Virginia
American football wide receivers
American football defensive backs
African-American players of American football
James Madison Dukes football players
Albany Firebirds players
Indiana Firebirds players
21st-century African-American sportspeople
20th-century African-American sportspeople